Alaska Common Law School was an unaccredited school founded in 1984 in Kenai, Alaska. The school offered a two-year program to teach students how to represent themselves before Alaska courts. Graduates received pre-law certificates.

History
Alaska Common Law School of Barristry was founded in 1984 in Kenai, Alaska by a group that included Kenneth W. Cole and other members of "the Freedom movement." Around that time, Cole had filed a lawsuit against a hospital to prevent recording the birth of his daughter with the Alaska Bureau of Vital Statistics. Cole, who was not a licensed attorney at that time, found the legal process very intimidating, and at the end thought he had "been shuffled off to the side and not given much weight." The Alaska Common Law School was founded by the 25-year-old construction worker and his friends with the idea of "helping others use the courts to protect their rights" and to pursue a common desire to return the United States to "constitutional Christian government."

Initially, the school was run out of a private home in Kenai, where the administrators sold instructional materials, and featured a 90-hour video course as part of the school's curriculum. The facilities included a research room, a law library, an office, and a lecture room. The lecture room included an American flag that was arranged upside down above a sign that read: "Nation in distress." Students who attended the school in 1986, which included some who had civil lawsuit problems and others accused of criminal offenses, were taught how to represent themselves and receive advise from counselors and help drafting motions. Community members, such as Homer, Alaska assemblyman Tom Brown, also sought advise from the school.  Lacking a formal fee structure, the two-year-old school operated through donations and included an empty coffee can to receive contributions. Assemblyman Brown noted that the school was working for the people by "getting people involved in the system and forcing the system to accommodate them." The local assistant district attorney viewed the school as causing his office to spend a disproportionate amount of time working on frivolous proceedings. In the mid-1980s, the school called for the creation of a state militia. The school issued pre-law certificates after two years of education.

See also
 Legal education in Alaska

References

Education in Kenai Peninsula Borough, Alaska
Educational institutions established in 1984
Legal education in Alaska
1984 establishments in Alaska